William Wickham (August 11, 1871 – November 29, 1959) was an American farmer, businessman, and politician from New York.

Life 
Wickham was born on August 11, 1871 in Hector, New York, the son of Charles E. Wickham and Amelia Keep.

After attending public school, Wickham took a commercial course in Warner Business College in Elmira. He then returned home and worked as a farmer, leasing 151 acres from his father. Seven years later, he turned to merchandising and opened a store in 1899. In 1903, he was appointed postmaster of Hector. He was also manager of the New York & Pennsylvania Telephone office in Hector and president of the company that owned the local line between Hector and Logan. He later operated a large fruit, grain, and dairy farm in Hector.

In 1923, Wickham was elected to the New York State Assembly as a Republican, representing Schuyler County. He served in the Assembly in 1924 and 1925.

Wickham was a member of the Burdett Schuyler County Farm Bureau and the Freemasons. In 1892, he married Nellie Donnelly of Hector. Their son Don Wickham was the New York State Agriculture Commissioner.

Wickham moved to St. Petersburg, Florida in 1952. He died at his home there on November 29, 1959. He was buried in the Hector Presbyterian Church Cemetery.

References

External links 

 The Political Graveyard
 William Wickham at Find a Grave

1871 births
1959 deaths
People from Schuyler County, New York
Farmers from New York (state)
Businesspeople from New York (state)
20th-century American businesspeople
New York (state) postmasters
20th-century American politicians
Republican Party members of the New York State Assembly
American Freemasons
Burials in New York (state)